South Fork is an unincorporated community in Humboldt County, California, United States.

In 1955 South Fork was a town of 300 inhabitants. The town was devastated by the Christmas flood of 1964 which destroyed 10 houses and the station building.

References

Unincorporated communities in Humboldt County, California